The Royal Hamilton Amateur Dinghy Club (RHADC) is a private yacht club in the British Overseas Territory of Bermuda that was established as the Hamilton Amateur Dingey Association on, or before, 28 July 1882. It is the World's only Royal dinghy club.

History
There was already a Royal yacht club in Bermuda, the Royal Bermuda Yacht Club founded in 1845 after the sport of racing yachts had become established in Bermuda primarily as a pastime of idle officers of the Bermuda Garrison and the Royal Naval Dockyard, Bermuda.<ref>{{cite news |last=Smalls |first=H. B. |date=1912-09-24 |title=IN THE LONG AGO |work=The Royal Gazette |location=City of Hamilton, Pembroke Parish, Bermuda |quote=Mr. H. B. Small's letter to-day, gives an account of the first recorded Yacht race in Bermuda, some 150 years ago which is particularly interesting as recalling the sporting tendencies of the past.AN OLD YACHT RACETo The Editor of The Royal Gazette: Sir,—The recent Boat race here recalled to my mind that I had amongst my records, or Archives as I call them an account of the first yacht race held in Bermuda in the year of our Lord 1784, which is full of interest as affording an insight into life here in those "good old days of yore." Amongst the Garrison officers stationed at that time at St. George's, were a Captain Remington and a Captain Brown, both "wealthy and much addicted to sport. The former urged a Mr. J. Trott to "sail a race," and Captain Brown urged a Mr. W. Sears to accept the challenge,}}</ref> Members of that club, but its members focused primarily on racing sloops and schooners. The Hamilton Amateur Dingey Association was created to promote the racing of dinghies, which in Bermuda meant the Bermuda Fitted Dinghy, a scaled down version of the traditional sloops used as work boats and yachts in Bermuda. Sloops and dinghies were fitted with tall, raked masts and long bowsprits, fitted with the Bermuda rig.

The association held its first races on 28 July, with eight boats in the first class race, which was won by HC Masters in the Reckless, and four in the second class race, which was won by EW Cooper in the Ariel.

In 1883, HRH Princess Louise, daughter of Queen Victoria, visited Bermuda, conferring the Royal title and she donating a trophy which was awarded to the winner of a dinghy race held on 8 March, which was restricted to boats both owned and steered by club members. A purse race was held after, which was open to all amateurs. A defaced White ensign was made for the club by Messrs. Lanff & Neeve, 97 Leadenhall Street, London. A change in the rules for Royal titles was made in 1890, restricting the authority to grant these to the reigning Monarch. As the title had been conferred on the club by the Queen's daughter, not the Queen, authorisation to use it ceased and it became the Hamilton Amateur Dingey Club  'til dropping the word Amateur in 1896. In 1953, Her Majesty Queen Elizabeth II confirmed the 1883 grant of the Royal title by Princess Louise and the club became the Royal Hamilton Amateur Dinghy Club''.

See also
Royal Bermuda Yacht Club
Sport in Bermuda

References

Royal yacht clubs
Yacht clubs in Bermuda
Hamilton Amateur Dinghy Club, Royal
1882 establishments in Bermuda
Sports clubs established in 1882
Paget Parish